Jaco Barny Engels (born 17 December 1980, in Oranjemund) is a Namibian rugby union player whose usual position is prop.
As youngster while at primary school, Laerskool M.L. Fick, received Springbok / National Colours in Trampolining.

Career
He featured in both Currie Cup and Super Rugby winning squads while in Pretoria.

2013 Southern Kings Super Rugby season
He was included in the  squad for the 2013 Super Rugby season. He made appearances from the bench in each of the Kings' first four matches of the season, but  prop Grant Kemp was preferred to him for the remainder of the campaign. He made two appearances for the  2013 Vodacom Cup campaign before linking up with
 for the 2013 Africa Cup.

International
He only made his debut for them aged 32, when he was included in a Namibian team to face a South Africa President's XV in 2013 and then represented Namibia in their 2013 Africa Cup Division 1B campaign.

References

1980 births
Living people
Namibian rugby union players
Namibia international rugby union players
Rugby union props
Eastern Province Elephants players
Southern Kings players
Bulls (rugby union) players
Blue Bulls players
Leopards (rugby union) players
White Namibian people
Namibian expatriate rugby union players
Expatriate rugby union players in South Africa
Namibian expatriate sportspeople in South Africa
People from ǁKaras Region
Namibian people of German descent